A transaxle is a single mechanical device which combines the functions of an automobile's transmission, axle, and differential into one integrated assembly.  It can be produced in both manual and automatic versions.

Engine and drive at the same end
Transaxles are nearly universal in all automobile configurations that have the engine placed at the same end of the car as the driven wheels: the front-engine/front-wheel-drive; rear-engine/rear-wheel-drive; and mid-engine/rear-wheel-drive arrangements.

Many mid- and rear-engined vehicles use a transverse engine and transaxle, similar to a front-wheel-drive unit.  Others use a longitudinal engine and transaxle like Ferrari's 1989 Mondial t which used a "T" arrangement with a longitudinal engine connected to a transverse transaxle.  Front-wheel-drive versions of modern Audis, from the A4 upwards, along with their related marques from the Volkswagen Group (which share the same automobile layout) also use a similar layout, but with the transaxle also mounted longitudinally.

The front-wheel-drive Renault 16 had a longitudinal engine and transaxle, with the engine behind the transaxle.  The transaxle case was designed to allow the final-drive ring gear to be on either side of the pinion; this allowed the engine-transaxle assembly to be used in the rear-wheel-drive Lotus Europa, which had the engine in front of the transaxle (i.e., mid-engined).

Front-engine, rear-wheel-drive transaxles
Front-engine, rear-wheel-drive vehicles tend to have the transmission up front just after the engine, but sometimes a front-engine drives a rear-mounted transaxle.  This is generally done for reasons of weight distribution and is therefore common on sports cars.  Another advantage is that since the driveshaft spins at engine speed, it only has to endure the torque of the engine instead of the torque multiplied by the 1st gear ratio. This design was pioneered in the 1934 Škoda Popular, and then in the 1950 Lancia Aurelia, designed by Vittorio Jano.

Since this placement of the gearbox is unsuitable for a live axle (due to excessive unsprung mass), the rear suspension is either independent, or uses a de Dion tube (notably in Alfa Romeos).  Rare exceptions to this rule were the Bugatti T46 and T50 which had a three speed gearbox on a live axle.

Notable Front-engine, rear-wheel-drive vehicles with a transaxle design include:

Rear-engine, rear-wheel-drive transaxles
Volkswagen and later Porsche made extensive use of transaxles in their rear (and mid) engined vehicles. Over the years, models adopting this configuration have included:

Four-wheel-drive
All Audi cars with longitudinal engines and their 'trademark' quattro four-wheel-drive (4WD) system, along with their related marques from the Volkswagen Group which share the same layout, utilise a transaxle.  This is mounted immediately behind the front-mounted engine (again, longitudinally) and contains the 'gearbox' (manual, automatic, DSG, or CVT), along with both the centre differential, and the front differential and final drive unit.

The Nissan GT-R and Ferrari FF (and its successors) are unusual in being all-wheel-drive cars with front-engined layouts and rear-mounted transaxles. In the Nissan, one driveshaft sends power to the transaxle (which also contains the 'center' differential) and another driveshaft sends power back along the car to the front wheels. In the Ferrari, the rear transaxle works in a conventional manner, whilst the drive to the front wheels comes from a separate gearbox at the front of the engine. 

Other 4WD applications include:
1979-2002 Volkswagen Vanagon/Caravelle Syncro Edition - rear-engined, transaxle in the front;
1984–1986 Ford RS200 – mid-engined, with the gearbox in the front;
1989-2001 Mitsubishi 3000GT - front-engined, gearbox (transmission, front and centre differential) in the front;
2007–on   Nissan GT-R – front-engined, gearbox in the rear.
2011–2016 Ferrari FF

See also
Hybrid Synergy Drive
Powertrain
Drivetrain
Transfer case

References

Automotive transmission technologies
Auto parts